North Cowichan (Canada 2021 Census population 31,990) is a district municipality established in 1873 on Vancouver Island, in British Columbia, Canada. The municipality is part of the Cowichan Valley Regional District. North Cowichan is noted for a landscape including forests, beaches, rivers, and lakes. The municipality encompasses the communities of Chemainus; Westholme; Crofton; Maple Bay; and "the South End".  The latter is an informal name for a built-up area which is essentially a suburb of the City of Duncan, a separate municipality.

Geography
Located on the east coast of southern Vancouver Island, North Cowichan is centrally located immediately north of and adjacent to the city of Duncan and south of Ladysmith. Spanning 193.98 square kilometers, North Cowichan includes the communities of Chemainus, Crofton, Westholme, Maple Bay and the so-called "South End" which is functionally a suburb of Duncan, a separate municipality.

Geology
The last glacial period, the Fraser Glaciation occurred between 29,000 and 15,000 years ago. The glaciers that formed carved out the Cowichan Valley and left behind glaciers up to 30 metres thick. These fertile lands and mild climate have led to a history rich in agriculture.

Climate
Sheltered by the mountains of the central Island and the Olympic Peninsula, North Cowichan has a temperate, Mediterranean-like climate, with mild, damp winters with little snowfall and warm, dry summers. North Cowichan is classified as a warm-summer mediterranean climate Csb by the Köppen system.

Demographics

The median family income in 2006 for North Cowichan was $62,125, which is below the British Columbia provincial average of $65,787.

Ethnicity 

Note: Totals greater than 100% due to multiple origin responses.

Religion 
According to the 2021 census, religious groups in North Cowichan included:
Irreligion (18,180 persons or 57.9%)
Christianity (11,885 persons or 37.8%)
Sikhism (385 persons or 1.2%)
Islam (160 persons or 0.5%)
Hinduism (150 persons or 0.5%)
Buddhism (125 persons or 0.4%)
Indigenous Spirituality (70 persons or 0.2%)
Judaism (60 persons or 0.2%)

Communities
Chemainus
Crofton
Maple Bay
South End (adjacent to the City of Duncan)

Transportation
North Cowichan is serviced by the Maple Bay Airport (YAQ), which offers services to Vancouver Downtown, Vancouver Airport, Ganges on Salt Spring Island and Bedwell Harbour on Pender Island. Service is provided by Saltspring Air and Harbour Air.

The British Columbia Highway 1 traverses the municipality as a four lane arterial divided highway with signals at major intersections. The speed limit varies between 80 to 90 km/h.

British Columbia Highway 18 connects North Cowichan to Lake Cowichan as a 2-lane facility with a speed limit as high as 100 km/hr.

Bus service in the municipality is provided by the Cowichan Valley Regional District.

North Cowichan has embraced roundabouts at many intersections on its network of municipal roads. As of 2021 North Cowichan has 14 roundabouts.

Economy
The original economic drivers steamed from the abundance of natural resources, including the fur trade, fishing, mining, and the forest industry. Today, the forest industry, retail, construction, manufacturing, and health care are large contributors to the local economy.

Education
North Cowichan lies within the School District 79 Cowichan Valley. There are many elementary schools, and two secondary schools.

North Cowichan is served by one public post secondary educational institution, Vancouver Island University.

Media outlets
North Cowichan is served by three newspapers – the Duncan Journal, the Cowichan Valley Citizen, and the Chemainus Valley Courier. North Cowichan is also serviced by 89.7 Juice FM, a member of Vista Radio.

Attractions
North Cowichan is home to the BC Forest Discovery Centre, the Pacific Northwest Raptors Bird of Prey and Raptor Visitor Center, and the world famous Chemainus Murals.

Arts
The Cowichan Theatre hosts many performers and shows during the year. The Chemainus Theatre Festival features classic and award winning comedies, musicals and dramas.

Recreation
North Cowichan is home to many recreation centres, including the Cowichan Aquatic Centre, cowichan community Centre, Fuller Lake Arena and the Cowichan Sportsplex. North Cowichan offers numerous parks and hiking trails.

Power supply
The Vancouver Island terminal of the HVDC Vancouver-Island is found here.

Notes

References

External links

Cowichan Valley
District municipalities in British Columbia
Populated places in the Cowichan Valley Regional District
Populated places on the British Columbia Coast